Charles Edward Hamm (April 21, 1925 – October 16, 2011) was an American musicologist, writer, composer, and music educator. He is credited with being the first music historian to seriously study and write about American popular music. He also was one of the founders of the International Association for the Study of Popular Music (IASPM).

Born in Charlottesville, Virginia, Hamm graduated from the University of Virginia in 1947 where he was a member of the Virginia Glee Club. Zachary Woolfe wrote in The New York Times that "Mr. Hamm was one of the first scholars to study the history of American popular music with musicological rigor and sensitivity to complex racial and ethnic dynamics, and both oral and written traditions. He traced pop’s history not just to its full recent flowering in the 1950s or to the 19th century and Stephen Foster, but also to the colonial-era compositions that created the context for all that followed."

In 2002 he was awarded a Lifetime Achievement Award by the Society for American Music.

He died of pneumonia, leaving 3 sons.

Works
Yesterdays: Popular Song in America (1979) 
Music in the New World (1983) 
Putting Popular Music in its Place (1995)
Irving Berlin: Songs From the Melting Pot (1997)
Graceland Revisited

References

External links
 Collection guide to Charles Hamm Recordings, University of Pittsburgh
The Charles E. Hamm Collection, Center for Black Music Research Collection, Columbia College Chicago, Chicago, Illinois.

1925 births
2011 deaths
University of Virginia alumni
20th-century American musicologists
21st-century American musicologists
People from Charlottesville, Virginia
Du Fay scholars